William M. Lindsay (24 July 1880 – 22 February 1957) was an American politician. Between 1937 and 1939 he served as Lieutenant Governor of Kansas.

Life
William Lindsay was born in Allegany County, Maryland. There is almost no information available about his life besides politics. Since 1886 he lived in Kansas and for at least some time he resided in Pittsburg. He joined the Democratic Party and in 1936 he was elected as the first Democrat to the office of the Lieutenant Governor of Kansas. He served in this function between 11 January 1937 and 9 January 1939 when his term ended. In this function he was the deputy of Governor Walter A. Huxman. He died on 22 February 1957 in Pittsburg (Kansas).

External links
 The Political Graveyard
 The Lieutenant Governors of Kansas

1880 births
1957 deaths
Lieutenant Governors of Kansas
Kansas Democrats
People from Allegany County, Maryland